Ishkoshim District or Nohiya-i Ishkoshim is a district in eastern Tajikistan, in the extreme south-west of the Gorno-Badakhshan Autonomous Region (GBAO). It borders Afghanistan along the river Panj to the south and to the west. The population of Ishkoshim district is 32,900 (1 January 2020 estimate).

The district is roughly V-shaped and lies northeast of the Panj River where its course turns from west to north.  It is bordered on the south and west Afghanistan across the Panj River and the lower Pamir River and on the north by Roshtqal'a District. There are short borders with Shughnon District to the north and Murghab District to the east.  The Shakhdara Range is along the northern border with Roshtqal'a District and the north–south Ishkoshim Range is along the district's eastern border. 

The district capital is Ishkoshim, a town at the bend of the Panj, opposite the Ishkashim District in Afghanistan. There is an ancient balas ruby (technically spinel) mine at Kuh-i-Lal.  Ishkoshim District is a particularly attractive destination in Gorno-Badakhshan for its archaeological sites and spectacular scenery.

Administrative divisions
They are as follows:

References

Districts of Tajikistan

Gorno-Badakhshan Autonomous Region